Leucotmemis rubribasalis is a moth of the subfamily Arctiinae. It was described by Max Gaede in 1926. It is found in Colombia.

References
Citations

Sources
 

Leucotmemis
Moths described in 1926